Human Museum is the debut studio album by Russian metal band Icon in Me.

Track listing 
 Dislocated (5:09)
 That Day, That Sorrow (3:25)
 End Of File (4:15)
 Empty Hands (6:02)
 Moments (4:14)
 Blood Ritual (2:31)
 To The End (4:55)
 In Memorium (1:13)
 The Worthless King (4:54)
 Turn The Dead On (4:40)
 Avoiding The Pain (5:24)

Bonus tracks 
 Torn Black Sky (3:58)
 Fierce By God (4:22)

External links 
 Review by LordsOfMetal.Nl
 Review by RockRealms.Com

Icon in Me albums
2009 debut albums